Reet Kasik (born 5 May 1946) is an Estonian linguist.

She was born in Tallinn. In 1969, she graduated from Tartu State University  with a degree in Estonian philology. Since 1969, she has taught at the University of Tartu. She has also taught Estonian language in several universities in Finland.

She has investigated word forming of Estonian language, teaching of Estonian language to foreigners, and language of journalism.

In 2018, she was given Wiedemann Language Award.

Selected publications
 Mati Erelt, Reet Kasik, Helle Metslang et al., "Eesti keele grammatika 2. Süntaks". Tallinn: Eesti TA Keele ja Kirjanduse Instituut, 1993
 Reet Kasik, "Hakkame rääkima! Viron kielen peruskurssi". Turku, (5. edition 1994, 7. edition 1997)
 Mati Erelt, Reet Kasik, Helle Metslang jt., "Eesti keele grammatika 1. Morfoloogia, sõnamoodustus". Tallinn: Eesti TA Keele ja Kirjanduse Instituut, 1995
 Reet Kasik, "Johdatus viron kielen tutkimukseen" Helsinki : Suomalais-ugrilainen seura, Suomalais-ugrilainen laitos, 1999
 Reet Kasik, "Eesti keele sõnatuletus". Tartu: Tartu Ülikooli Kirjastus, 1996 (2., täiendatud ja parandatud trükk 2004, 3. parandatud trükk 2009)
 Reet Kasik, "Sissejuhatus tekstiõpetusse". Tartu: Tartu Ülikooli Kirjastus, 2007
 Reet Kasik, Mati Erelt, Tiiu Erelt, "Eesti keele väljendusõpetus kõrgkoolidele". Tallinn: M. Erelt, 2007
 Reet Kasik, "Stahli mantlipärijad: eesti keele uurimise lugu." Tartu: Tartu Ülikooli Kirjastus, 2011
 Reet Kasik, "Sõnamoodustus" ("Eesti keele varamu", 1.) Tartu: Tartu Ülikooli Kirjastus, 2015

References

Living people
1946 births
Linguists from Estonia
University of Tartu alumni
Academic staff of the University of Tartu
Recipients of the Order of the White Star, 4th Class
People from Tallinn